Spruce Grove is a city that is  west of Edmonton, Alberta, in Canada. The city is adjacent to the Town of Stony Plain and is surrounded by Parkland County.

With a 2021 population of 37,645, Spruce Grove is the ninth-largest city in Alberta. The mayor of Spruce Grove is Jeff Acker.

Spruce Grove is home to the Horizon Stage Performing Arts Centre, a local theatre, and the TransAlta Tri Leisure Centre, a recreation facility shared with Stony Plain and Parkland County.

Jennifer Heil, the freestyle skier who won the first gold medal for Canada in the 2006 Winter Olympics in Turin, Italy, and a silver medal at the 2010 Winter Olympics is from Spruce Grove, as is Carla MacLeod, a member of the 2010 Canada women's national ice hockey team, and Hockey Hall of Fame member and Stanley Cup-winning goalie Grant Fuhr.

History 
Homesteaders in the area date back to 1879. Spruce Grove was incorporated as a village on March 14, 1907, but it was dissolved on August 30, 1916. Spruce Grove was re-incorporated as a village on January 1, 1955, and incorporated as a town on January 1, 1971, and as a city on March 1, 1986.

Geography 
It is part of the Edmonton Metropolitan Region.

Demographics 

Arts and culture  
The Spruce Grove Art Gallery is located in the Melcor Cultural Centre and is operated by the Allied Arts Council of Spruce Grove. The gallery hosts ongoing shows for original art created by its members, made up of artists from mainly the Spruce Grove, Stony Plain and Parkland County area.

Horizon Stage hosts many plays and acts throughout the year, as well as a lot of community theatre. Spruce Grove also has a 7 screen theatre complex which opened in the fall of 2007.

Another cultural facility within the city is the Spruce Grove Grain Elevator Museum.

Attractions 
The TransAlta Tri Leisure Centre, opened in 2002, provides a pool, soccer fields, a gymnasium, workout gym, and ice rinks to the people of Parkland County. Spruce Grove has bike trails winding throughout the city, called the Heritage Grove Trail, where bike riders can ride for hours through lush forest.  On June 7, 2008, Spruce Grove held the grand opening of the West District Park, which features two full artificial surface fields for football, soccer and other activities.  The Edmonton Eskimos donated $10,000 towards the event and held practice at the facility as part of the first-day activities.

Sports 
Spruce Grove has a number of youths and adults involved in amateur sports, that run year round. Box lacrosse runs from March to July under the organization Parkland Posse , which pulls young people from the Tri communities of Spruce Grove, Stony Plain and Parkland County. Hockey runs from September to April, soccer and rugby run from May to October, football runs from July to December and baseball runs from March to October. The Spruce Grove Saints are a Junior A hockey team that play in the Alberta Junior Hockey League.

The TransAlta Tri Leisure Centre is an activity centre formed as a union between the municipalities of Parkland County, Stony Plain and Spruce Grove. It is located in the west end of Spruce Grove.  The centre was opened to the public by Premier Ralph Klein on September 18, 2002.

, the Myshak Metro Ballpark is under construction. Upon completion, it will become the home stadium of the Edmonton Prospects.

Infrastructure

Transportation 
Highways
Two highways pass through Spruce Grove, Highway 16 (Yellowhead Highway) and Highway 16A. Highway 16 has no traffic lights but has two exits into Spruce Grove, while Highway 16A has several traffic intersections. Travelling east of either of these highways will lead to Edmonton. Travelling west on Highway 16A will lead to Stony Plain, and going west on either highway will lead to Edson, Hinton, and eventually Jasper.
Local streets
The majority of the streets in Spruce Grove use a standard naming system. Their names share a first letter with that of its subdivision. For example, all streets start with M in Millgrove subdivision; in Woodhaven, they all start with W. Only in the original subdivision of Broxton Park and the downtown core is this naming convention not utilized.
Rail
The Canadian passenger train travels through the city, however, the nearest stop is at Edmonton.
Transit
Edmonton Transit Service offers a commuter transit route from Spruce Grove to Edmonton, peak hours only.
There is also a local transit service run by the city for transportation within the city boundaries.
Air
Local air travel is provided by Parkland Airport and Villeneuve Airport. However, the nearest major international airport is the Edmonton International Airport, just south of Edmonton.

Education 
Public schools
Spruce Grove is part of the Parkland School Division No. 70. The following public schools are located in Spruce Grove.
Brookwood School
Copperhaven School
École Broxton Park School
Greystone Centennial Middle School
Millgrove School
Parkland Village School
Spruce Grove Composite High School
Woodhaven K-9 School
Prescott Learning Centre

Separate schools
Spruce Grove is part of the Evergreen Catholic Separate Regional Division No. 2. The following separate schools are located in Spruce Grove.
St. Joseph's Catholic School
St. Marguerite Catholic School
St. Peter the Apostle Catholic High School
St. Thomas Aquinas Catholic School

Private schools
Living Waters Christian Academy

Media 
Spruce Grove receives almost all of its print, radio, and television media from Edmonton.

However, Spruce Grove has its own weekly newspaper, the Spruce Grove Examiner, delivered to all homes every Friday. This newspaper holds almost exclusively local news. The area has a radio station, 88.1 The One is dedicated to Spruce Grove, Stony Plain, and area.

Notable people 
Stu Barnes (former professional hockey player)
Nathan Dempsey (former professional hockey player)
Grant Fuhr (former professional hockey player, member of the Hockey Hall of Fame)
Jennifer Heil (former Olympic moguls skier)
Mark Korte (professional Canadian football player)
Carla MacLeod (former Olympic hockey player)
Howie Schumm and Herb Schumm (brothers, both former professional Canadian football players)
Ben Scrivens (professional hockey player)
Keith Shologan (professional Canadian football player)
Grant Stevenson (professional hockey player)

See also 
List of cities in Canada

References

External links 

 
1907 establishments in Alberta
1955 establishments in Alberta
Cities in Alberta
Edmonton Metropolitan Region